María Soledad Garay Cabrera (born 27 November 1996), known as Soledad Garay, is a Paraguayan footballer who plays as a midfielder for Deportivo Capiatá and the Paraguay women's national team.

International career
Garay represented Paraguay at the 2014 FIFA U-20 Women's World Cup. At senior level, she played the 2018 Copa América Femenina.

References

1996 births
Living people
Women's association football midfielders
Paraguayan women's footballers
Paraguay women's international footballers
Deportivo Capiatá players